Kerala Gazetted Officers' Association (KGOA) is a prominent left-leaning service organization in the state of Kerala, India, that represents the Gazetted Officers of the state civil service. Founded in 1966, the organization consists of professionals like Engineers, Physicians, Veterinary Surgeons, Agricultural Officers, Scientific & Technical officers, Administrators, and Ministerial officers. Approximately 22,000 out of the 35,000 Gazetted Officers in service in the state are members of KGOA.

Objectives 
KGOA emphasizes on the necessity of people-oriented civil service, and has been instrumental in taking up causes of the civil servants and working class since its inception. The KGOA News monthly is the mouthpiece of the organization.

Headquarters and organizational structure 
It is headquartered at the KGOA State Committee Office near the Kerala Secretariat, Palayam, Thiruvananthapuram. The state committee, composed of elected members, acts as the apex decision-making and organizational body. There are district committees and offices in each district that carry out functions at the district-level.

Office bearers 
The state-level office bearers of The Kerala Gazetted Officers' Association (as of 2021) are listed below.

References

External links
Kerala Non-Gazetted Officers Union (NGO Union)

Gazetted Officers' Association
Public sector trade unions
1966 establishments in Kerala
Centre of Indian Trade Unions
World Federation of Trade Unions
Trade unions established in 1966